Icy commonly refers to conditions involving ice, a frozen state, usually referring to frozen water.

Icy or Icey may also refer to:

People
 Icy Spicy Leoncie, an Icelandic-Indian musician

Arts, entertainment, and media

Music
 ICY (band), a vocalist trio
 "Icy" (Itzy song), 2019
 "Icy" (Gucci Mane song), 2005
 "Icy", a song by Kim Petras from the album Clarity, 2019
 "Icy", a song by Logic from the album Confessions of a Dangerous Mind, 2019
 "Icy", a song by Vain from the album No Respect, 1989
 "Icey", a song by Young Thug from the EP On the Rvn, 2018

Other
 Icey, a 2016 video game
 Icy, a member of the Trix in the fictional series Winx Club

Other uses
 Icy (application), a package manager for iPhone OS
 iCy, a penguin toy that is similar to the iDog

See also
 The Icee Company, makers of ICEE frozen carbonated beverage
 IcyHot, a brand of liniments
 ICEE (disambiguation)